DeVante' Jones (born April 9, 1998) is an American professional basketball player for Metropolitans 92 in the French LNB Pro A. He played college basketball for the Michigan Wolverines of the Big Ten Conference. He previously played for the Coastal Carolina Chanticleers.

High school career
Jones attended Tyner Academy in Chattanooga, Tennessee and led his team to the Region 3-AA championship in 2014. As a sophomore, he averaged 16 points, 4 rebounds and 5.9 assists per game. For his last two years of high school, he transferred to St. Augustine High School in New Orleans, where he helped his team achieve a combined 52–9 record. As a junior, he averaged 16.5 points, 4 rebounds and 6 assists per game. As a senior, he averaged 17 points, 5 rebounds, 6.5 assists and 3 steals per game. Jones played for Notre Dame Preparatory School in Fitchburg, Massachusetts for a postgraduate season where he averaged 25 points, 5 rebounds and 4 assists per game. He committed to playing college basketball for Coastal Carolina.

College career
Jones was ruled ineligible by Coastal Carolina for the 2017–18 season for academic reasons and was granted a redshirt for the second half of the season. He suffered an injury during his second career game and missed his next 12 games. On March 25, 2019, Jones posted a freshman season-high 32 points, seven rebounds and seven assists in a 109–91 win over West Virginia in the second round of the College Basketball Invitational. As a freshman, he averaged 14 points, 3.9 rebounds and 3.6 assists per game, earning Sun Belt Freshman of the Year honors. 

Prior to his sophomore season, Jones suffered a broken bone in his left foot during a pick-up game. On March 7, 2020, he recorded 31 points, 14 rebounds and five assists in a 63–62 victory over UT Arlington in the first round of the Sun Belt tournament. As a sophomore, he averaged 17.4 points, 5.8 rebounds, 5.7 assists and 1.7 steals per game. He was named to the Second Team All-Sun Belt after leading the conference in assists. On December 17, Jones reached 1,000 career points while tallying 33 points, seven rebounds and six steals to help his team defeat Delaware State, 99–73. In his following game, he recorded 35 points and five steals in an 86–63 win over Alice Lloyd. As a junior, Jones averaged 19.3 points, 7.2 rebounds, 2.9 assists and 2.8 steals per game. He ranked second nationally in steals per game was selected as Sun Belt Player of the Year and First Team All-Sun Belt.

On May 1, 2021, Jones transferred to Michigan, choosing the Wolverines over offers from Texas Tech, Texas and Memphis.

Professional career
On July 25, 2022, he has signed with Metropolitans 92 of the LNB Pro A.

Career statistics

College

|-
| style="text-align:left;"| 2017–18
| style="text-align:left;"| Coastal Carolina
| style="text-align:center;" colspan="11"|  Redshirt
|-
| style="text-align:left;"| 2018–19
| style="text-align:left;"| Coastal Carolina
| 23 || 20 || 29.8 || .461 || .337 || .818 || 3.9 || 3.6 || 1.3 || .0 || 14.0
|-
| style="text-align:left;"| 2019–20
| style="text-align:left;"| Coastal Carolina
| 32 || 31 || 32.8 || .488 || .296 || .867 || 5.8 || 5.7 || 1.7 || .2 || 17.4
|-
| style="text-align:left;"| 2020–21
| style="text-align:left;"| Coastal Carolina
| 26 || 26 || 32.8 || .487 || .368 || .862 || 7.2 || 2.9 || 2.8 || .2 || 19.3
|-
| style="text-align:left;"| 2021–22
| style="text-align:left;"| Michigan
| 33 || 33 || 28.8 || .463 || .342 || .792 || 4.5 || 4.6 || .9 || .1 || 10.3
|- class="sortbottom"
| style="text-align:center;" colspan="2"| Career
| 114 || 110 || 31.0 || .477 || .336 || .845 || 5.3 || 4.3 || 1.7 || .1 || 15.1

References

External links
Michigan Wolverines bio
Coastal Carolina Chanticleers bio

1998 births
Living people
American men's basketball players
Basketball players from New Orleans
Coastal Carolina Chanticleers men's basketball players
Metropolitans 92 players
Michigan Wolverines men's basketball players
Point guards